The 2000–01 Israeli Noar Leumit League was the seventh season since its introduction in 1994. It is the top-tier football in Israel for teenagers between the ages 18–20.

Maccabi Tel Aviv won the title, whilst Bnei Yehuda and Hapoel Ra'anana were relegated.

Final table

External links
Noar Premier League 00-01 One.co.il 

Israeli Noar Premier League seasons
Youth